Alan Richard Cameron (born October 21, 1955) is a Canadian former professional ice hockey defenceman.

Cameron played two seasons with the New Westminster Bruins of the WHL, 1973–75 where in the last year, the Bruins made it to the Memorial Cup finals, losing to the Toronto Marlies.

He was drafted 37th overall by the Detroit Red Wings in the 1975 NHL Amateur Draft and eventually played 282 games with the Red Wings and the Winnipeg Jets in the NHL.

Career statistics

Regular season and playoffs

External links

1955 births
Living people
Canadian ice hockey defencemen
Detroit Red Wings draft picks
Detroit Red Wings players
Kalamazoo Wings (1974–2000) players
Kansas City Red Wings players
New Westminster Bruins players
Ice hockey people from Edmonton
Tulsa Oilers (1964–1984) players
Winnipeg Jets (1979–1996) players